Count Johann Georg von Browne (or Johann Georg von Browne-Camus; 20 September 1767 – January 1827) was an officer in the Russian army, and settled in Vienna where he was a patron of Ludwig van Beethoven during the composer's early career.

Life
Von Browne was born in Riga in 1767. His father was George Browne, an Irish soldier of fortune who became an officer in the Imperial Russian Army from 1730, reaching the rank of general.

Von Browne became a brigadier general in the Russian army. He moved with his wife to Vienna about 1794; his income came from his estates in Livonia. He was a patron of Ludwig van Beethoven during the composer's early career; Beethoven often visited his house, and his compositions were often performed there. Ferdinand Ries, a pupil of Beethoven, was through his recommendation appointed piano player at von Browne's house.

Several of Beethoven's compositions, from 1798 to 1803, were dedicated to von Browne: the String Trios, Op. 9, in which the composer calls him "Premiere Mécène de sa Muse" ("foremost patron of his muse"); Seven Variations for cello and piano in E-flat major on "Bei Männern welche Liebe fühlen" from Mozart's The Magic Flute, WoO 46; Piano Sonata No. 11, Op. 22; and Gellert-Lieder, Op. 48.

The Count's majordomo, Hofrat Johannes Büel, said that von Browne was "one of the strangest of men, on the one hand full of excellent talents and splendid qualities of heart and mind, and on the other full of weaknesses and depravity". He spent some years in a mental institution after a mental breakdown.

References

1767 births
1827 deaths
Military personnel from Riga
Russian patrons of music
Latvian people of Irish descent
Austrian people of Irish descent
Russian people of Irish descent